Aina Najwa (born 1 August 1996) is a Malaysian cricketer. She made her Women's Twenty20 International (WT20I) debut for Malaysia on 7 June 2018, in the 2018 Women's Twenty20 Asia Cup. In June 2022, she was selected in Malaysia's squad for 2022 ACC Women's T20 Championship.
In October 2022, she played for Malaysia in Women's Twenty20 Asia Cup.

References

External links
 

1996 births
Living people
Malaysian women cricketers
Malaysia women Twenty20 International cricketers
Cricketers at the 2014 Asian Games
Asian Games competitors for Malaysia